The 2020 PBA season or PBA Season 45 was the 45th season of the Philippine Basketball Association.

Due to the major adjustments in the last season's league calendar, the start of the league's 45th season was set on March 1, 2020, at the Smart Araneta Coliseum. However, the start of the 2020 season has been delayed until at least March 8 due to concerns over the COVID-19 pandemic.

The PBA Leo Awards for the 2019 season were held before the opening ceremonies. The first official activity for this season was the 2019 PBA draft, held before the semifinals of the 2019 PBA Governors' Cup.

The season was suspended on March 11, three days after its opening ceremonies, due to the COVID-19 pandemic and the enforcement of the enhanced community quarantine in Luzon.

The league initially planned to use the three-conference format, starting with the Philippine Cup. The Commissioner's Cup and the Governors' Cup were supposed to be the second and third conferences for this season.

On September 17, the PBA Board of Governors have approved a plan to restart the season on October 11 (originally on October 9), then was given a provisional approval by the Inter-Agency Task Force for the Management of Emerging Infectious Diseases (IATF-EID) on September 24. All games were played in the "PBA bubble"  in Angeles City, the isolation zone specifically created for league operations.

This was first time that the league played only one tournament or conference in a season.

Since the season only had one conference, the Most Valuable Player was not awarded. In lieu of the Leo Awards usually given at the end of the season, the league held a special awards night on January 17, 2021, to award the Best Player of the Conference, Outstanding Rookie, Most Improved Player, Samboy Lim Sportsmanship Award and Outstanding/Elite Five.

Executive board
 Commissioner: Willie Marcial
 Chairman: Ricky Vargas (Representing TNT Tropang Giga)
 Vice-Chairman: Demosthenes Rosales (Representing Terrafirma Dyip)
 Treasurer: Silliman Sy (Representing Blackwater Elite)

Teams

Player quotas

Filipino-foreigners
The PBA allows for each team to have up to five players classified as "Filipino-foreigners" in their roster. Filipino-foreigners are natural born Filipinos born outside the Philippines.

Imports
There are no imports who played for the 2020 PBA season due to the cancellation of the Commissioner's Cup and the Governors' Cup.

Arenas
In a usual PBA season, like several Metro Manila-centric leagues, most games are held at arenas within Metro Manila, either the Smart Araneta Coliseum or the Mall of Asia Arena, and sometimes, in the Ynares Center in Antipolo. Games outside this area are called "out-of-town" games, and are usually played on Saturdays. Provincial arenas usually host one game, rarely two; these arenas typically host only once per season, but a league may return within a season if the turnout is satisfactory. Typically, all playoff games are held in Metro Manila arenas, although playoff and Finals games have been seldom played in the provinces.

Only one game day was done prior to the suspension of league activities due to COVID-19 pandemic; this was the opening day game held after the opening ceremonies at the Smart Araneta Coliseum.

After the league decided to resume the season under a bubble setup, it was decided that the Clark Freeport and Special Economic Zone in Pampanga shall host the bubble, with the Angeles University Foundation hosting the actual games.

Note
1. For marketing purposes, games which took place in Angeles, within the PBA Bubble, were said to take place in "Smart Clark Giga City". The AUF Sports & Cultural Center was likewise rebranded as "AUF Sports Arena Powered by Smart 5G".

Transactions

Retirement 
 In February 2020, Yancy de Ocampo announced his retirement from the PBA. De Ocampo played for 6 franchises in his 17 seasons in the league.
 On April 14, 2020, Ranidel de Ocampo announced his retirement from the PBA. De Ocampo played for 3 franchises in his 16 seasons in the league.
 On September 7, 2020, Kelly Williams announced his retirement from the PBA. Williams played for 2 franchises in his 14 seasons in the league.
 On September 22, 2020, Peter June Simon announced his retirement from the PBA. Simon played for the Magnolia Hotshots in his 16 seasons in the league.

Coaching changes

Notable events
November 22, 2019: Ricky Vargas of TNT KaTropa was re-elected for a third consecutive term as the Chairman of the PBA Board of Governors. Bobby Rosales of Columbian Dyip was elected as Vice Chairman while Silliman Sy of Blackwater Elite was elected as treasurer.
February 5: Reigning five-time Most Valuable Player June Mar Fajardo suffered a leg injury, fracturing his right tibia during their team practice.
February 9: Greg Slaughter announced through his Instagram account that his contract with Barangay Ginebra San Miguel had expired and he will take an indefinite leave from basketball.
 The start of the 2020 season was postponed to March 8 due to concerns over the COVID-19 pandemic. The opening ceremonies were originally scheduled on March 1.
June 4: The PBA Board of Governors approved the transfer of ownership of the Columbian Dyip franchise from Columbian Autocar Corporation to its sister company, Terrafirma Realty Development Corporation. The team will carry the Terrafirma brand.
June 16: TNT KaTropa assistant coach Tab Baldwin was slapped with a three-game suspension plus a P75,000 fine by the commissioner's office for his comments on the league's officiating, tournament format and assessment of local coaches during a podcast. On June 25, he was fired by TNT as their assistant coach.
July 6: Barangay Ginebra San Miguel's Japeth Aguilar and Rain or Shine Elasto Painters's Adrian Wong were fined P20,000 each after both players were seen playing five-on-five basketball a week earlier. They were also ordered to undergo a swab test and take a 14-day quarantine. The league announced on March that all player practices are banned indefinitely due to the COVID-19 pandemic.
July 15: Blackwater Elite team owner Dioceldo Sy announced that he is planning to sell their PBA franchise for P150 million. This is after the PBA and the Games and Amusements Board considered to give sanctions against the team for violating league and health protocols following the alleged workout the team did on July 11. PBA Commissioner Willie Marcial slapped a P100,000 fine and required all players to undergo a swab-test.
August 1: The Blackwater Elite will be renamed as the "Blackwater Bossing" starting in the 2021 season. Team owner Dioceldo Sy also retracted his plan to sell the team's franchise.
September 26: The TNT KaTropa will be renamed as the "TNT Tropang Giga" upon the resumption of the Philippine Cup on October 11.
September 30: The PBA D-League's Aspirants' Cup has been officially cancelled. Majority of the participating teams have collegiate or amateur players and the IATF-EID only allowed professional players to participate in practices and scrimmages.
 October 16: The San Miguel Beermen wore their throwback 1992 jerseys for the first time. The retro jerseys, which also features the PBA logo used from 1989 to 1992, will be worn in select games for the duration of the Philippine Cup in honor of the 130th anniversary of the San Miguel Pale Pilsen product.
 October 21: The league announced that a referee tested positive for COVID-19. 
 October 24: The Alaska Aces wore their throwback 1996 jerseys in honor of the team that won the franchise's grand slam.
 October 25: The indefinite suspension on Phoenix Super LPG Fuel Masters' Calvin Abueva was lifted.
 October 25: In a separate press conference, PBA Commissioner Willie Marcial announced that one of the players of Blackwater Elite tested positive for COVID-19.
 November 1: Topex Robinson was appointed as the full-time head coach of the Phoenix Super LPG Fuel Masters.

Opening ceremony
The opening ceremony for this season was held at the Smart Araneta Coliseum in Quezon City on March 8, 2020. The PBA Leo Awards for the 2019 season was held before the opening ceremonies.

The first game of the Philippine Cup between the San Miguel Beermen and the Magnolia Hotshots was played after the opening ceremonies.

Below is the list of team muses:

2020 PBA Philippine Cup

The 2020 Philippine Cup started on March 8, 2020. The opening game which won by the San Miguel Beermen against the Magnolia Hotshots, 94–78, was the only game played for the tournament before the start of the quarantine period on March 11.

The tournament resumed on October 11, suspended again on October 30, resumed again on November 3, and ended on December 9.

Elimination round

Playoffs

Quarterfinals

|}*Team has twice-to-beat advantage. Team #1 only has to win once, while Team #2 has to win twice.

Semifinals

|}

Finals

|}

 Finals MVP: LA Tenorio

Awards

Season awards
 Best Player of the Conference (Philippine Cup): Stanley Pringle (Barangay Ginebra)
 Outstanding Rookie: Aaron Black (Meralco)
 Most Improved Player: Prince Caperal (Barangay Ginebra)
 Elite Five:
 Stanley Pringle (Barangay Ginebra)
 Matthew Wright (Phoenix Super LPG)
 Calvin Abueva (Phoenix Super LPG)
 Japeth Aguilar (Barangay Ginebra)
 John Paul Erram (TNT)
 Samboy Lim Sportsmanship Award: Scottie Thompson (Barangay Ginebra)

PBA Press Corps Annual Awards
 Top Bubble D-Fender: Justin Chua (Phoenix)
 Scoring Champion: CJ Perez (Terrafirma)
 Outstanding Coach of the Bubble: Tim Cone (Barangay Ginebra)
 Mr. Quality Minutes: RJ Jazul (Phoenix)
 Mr. Executive: Willie Marcial (PBA Commissioner)
All-Rookie Team
Aaron Black (Meralco)
Arvin Tolentino (Barangay Ginebra)
Roosevelt Adams (Terrafirma)
Barkley Eboña (Alaska)
Renzo Subido (NorthPort)
All Bubble D-Fenders
Mark Barroca (Magnolia)
Chris Ross (San Miguel)
Justin Chua (Phoenix)
Christian Standhardinger (NorthPort)
Calvin Abueva (Phoenix)
 Game of the Bubble: Barangay Ginebra vs. Meralco (November 27, 2020, Philippine Cup semifinals)
 President's Award: "Heroic 12" (all 12 PBA teams)

Suspension and restart of Philippine Cup 
On March 11, hours before Rudy Gobert tested positive for COVID-19 (causing the NBA to suspend its season), the PBA Board of Governors postponed the games of the Philippine Cup due to the COVID-19 pandemic and the enforcement of the enhanced community quarantine in Luzon. They have also decided to indefinitely postpone the ongoing PBA D-League Aspirants' Cup and the launching of the PBA 3x3 league.

On April 7, the PBA Board of Governors have decided to shorten the season to a two-conference format during their special meeting. There is also a possibility that the season will only have a single conference if the Enhanced Community Quarantine in Luzon will be further extended until April 30.

After the Enhanced Community Quarantine (ECQ) in Metro Manila and nearby provinces was extended until May 31, the Board of Governors have decided to set a deadline on August if the season will still be continued with a single tournament or if it will be cancelled.

On July 3, the Inter-Agency Task Force for the Management of Emerging Infectious Diseases (IATF-EID) announced that training for professional basketball and football are allowed after the PBA and Philippines Football League, together with the Philippine Sports Commission, Games and Amusements Board and the Department of Health, drafted guidelines for training for areas under General Community Quarantine (GCQ) and Modified General Community Quarantines (MGCQ). Metro Manila was classified as a GCQ area since June 1. The IATF-EID Joint Administrative Order was released on July 24.

The planned player swab testing and resumption of team practices were postponed after Metro Manila and its surrounding provinces were put under Modified Enhanced Community Quarantine (MECQ) on August 3 due to the surge of COVID-19 cases.

After Metro Manila returned to General Community Quarantine status on August 19, player swab testing was immediately done. Teams resumed their training sessions on August 25.

The league planned to resume the Philippine Cup in a "bubble setup" similar to how the NBA implemented their own bubble. The Araneta City in Cubao, the Inspire Sports Academy in Calamba, Laguna and the Clark Freeport Zone in Pampanga were considered as venues for the PBA bubble.

The PBA Board of Governors decided to hold the "PBA bubble" in the Clark area in Pampanga during their meeting on September 17. The games will be played at the Angeles University Foundation gymnasium while the players will stay at the Quest Hotel inside Clark. The league also plans to resume the Philippine Cup by October 11 if the league gets the approval from the IATF-EID. On September 24, the IATF-EID gave the league a provisional approval to have scrimmages and five-on-five games.  The 12 teams of PBA arrived in Clark by batches on September 28 and 29, 2020.

On October 6, the league published its complete eliminations schedule. The elimination round games of the Philippine Cup were played daily, with two games scheduled per day. The league also decided to retain the results of the San Miguel Beermen's 94–78 win over the Magnolia Hotshots on March 8, 2020; the only game played prior to the suspension of the Philippine Cup.

On October 21, the league announced that one of the referees who officiated the Blackwater-Alaska game a day before has tested positive for COVID-19. The referee was sent to the Athlete's Village in Capas, Tarlac. The said facility was used during the 2019 Southeast Asian Games and is the primary quarantine facility for OFWs during the pandemic. The said referee was tested negative on his RT-PCR test four days after. On the same day, it was announced that one of the players of Blackwater Elite had tested positive for COVID-19. As a result, three games involving TNT and Blackwater have been postponed as of October 29. The games will be rescheduled on a later date once the approval from the IATF-EID will be given.

On October 30, 2020, the league announced through their social media accounts that the games will be postponed to ensure the integrity of the PBA bubble and until the new protocols set by the IATF-EID and the Department of Health are in place.

The following day, the PBA announced that they will resume its games on Tuesday, November 3 after the IATF-EID issued the following new guidelines:
Completion of 10-day isolation of Blackwater player from the date of swabbing before resuming the games.
Completion of 14-day quarantine and testing before entering the bubble for all those who will test positive moving forward; and
The appointment of an independent marshal, who shall oversee and ensure compliance with health and safety protocols, as recommended by the DILG.
A quarantine facility will be set up within the Clark bubble for future COVID-19 positive cases.

In order for the league to finish the elimination round by November 11, two to four games were scheduled per day. This was the first time that the PBA held a quadruple-header game day.

Cumulative standings

Elimination round
See 2020 PBA Philippine Cup

Playoffs

Notes

References

See also
COVID-19 pandemic in the Philippines
Impact of the COVID-19 pandemic on sports

External links
 PBA Official Website

 
2019–20 in Philippine basketball leagues
Basketball events curtailed due to the COVID-19 pandemic